Hungerford Rural District was a rural district in Berkshire, England from 1894 to 1974, covering an area in the south-west of the county.

Evolution
The district had its origins in the Hungerford Rural Sanitary District. This had been created under the Public Health Act 1872, giving public health and local government responsibilities for rural areas to the existing boards of guardians of poor law unions. The Hungerford Rural Sanitary District covered the area of the Hungerford Poor Law Union, which had been established in 1835 and straddled the counties of Berkshire, Hampshire, and Wiltshire. The poor law union and rural sanitary district were administered from Hungerford Union Workhouse, which had been built in 1847 on Park Street in Hungerford.

Under the Local Government Act 1894, rural sanitary districts became rural districts from 28 December 1894. The act also directed that rural districts should not straddle county boundaries, and parishes should not straddle district (and therefore county) boundaries. It was decided in October 1894 that the single Hampshire parish in the rural sanitary district, Combe, should be transferred to Berkshire, whilst the three parishes which straddled Berkshire and Wiltshire (Hungerford, Chilton Foliat, and Shalbourne) were each placed in a single county, with the Wiltshire parts of Hungerford parish transferred to Berkshire, the Berkshire part of Shalbourne transferred to Wiltshire, and the Berkshire part of Chilton Foliat being added to Hungerford parish. Subject to these adjustments, the Berkshire parishes of the old rural sanitary district became the Hungerford Rural District, whilst the Wiltshire parishes became the Ramsbury Rural District. These boundaries were used to define the new rural district from its creation on 28 December 1894, but the process of formally adjusting the county boundaries to match took a little longer, so for the first few months of its existence Hungerford Rural District straddled Berkshire, Hampshire, and Wiltshire, but by October 1895 it was entirely in Berkshire. The link with the poor law union continued, with all the elected councillors of the Hungerford and Ramsbury rural districts together comprising the board of guardians for the Hungerford Poor Law Union, which renamed itself the Hungerford and Ramsbury Poor Law Union in 1896.

Parishes
Hungerford Rural District contained the following civil parishes:

Premises
Hungerford Rural District Council held its first meeting at the workhouse in Hungerford on 2 January 1895, when Henry Deacon Woodman was appointed the first chairman. He had previously been the chairman of the board of guardians, and was also re-elected to that post on the same day. The council was based at the workhouse on Park Street in Hungerford until 1933, when it moved to Faringdon House at 128 High Street, Hungerford. In 1953 the council moved to The Priory, a large Victorian house on the south-eastern outskirts of Hungerford, where it remained until its abolition in 1974.

Abolition
Hungerford Rural District was abolished under the Local Government Act 1972, becoming part of the new district of Newbury on 1 April 1974, which in turn became West Berkshire in 1998. The Hungerford Rural District Council's former offices at The Priory were converted into flats shortly after the council's abolition, before being completely redeveloped in 2011, with Redwood House being built on the site.

Notes

References

Districts of England created by the Local Government Act 1894
Districts of England abolished by the Local Government Act 1972
Rural districts of England
Former districts of Berkshire